The 2016 Formula STCC Nordic season is the fourth season of the single seater championship that supports the Scandinavian Touring Car Championship. The series went previously under the name of Formula Renault 1.6 Nordic, but the name was changed after Renault Sport dropped its support for the 3.5 and 1.6 classes in late 2015. The season will begin on 30 April at Skövde Airport and will end on 24 September at Ring Knutstorp, after fourteen races held in seven venues. Most of these rounds are held in support of the 2016 Scandinavian Touring Car Championship, joint organiser of the series along with the FIA Northern European Zone Organisation.

The series uses all-carbon Signatech chassis and Michelin tyres.

Drivers and teams

Race calendar and results
Except for the sixth round, which will be held in Finland, all races will take place in Sweden. All Swedish rounds are held in support of the STCC championship.

Rounds denoted with a blue background will be a part of the Formula STCC NEZ Championship.

Championship standings
Points system
Points are awarded to the top 10 classified finishers. An extra point is awarded for pole position and fastest lap for each race.

Parallel to the main championship, two other championships are held: the Formula STCC Junior Svenskt Mästerskap (JSM) for drivers under 26 years old holding a Swedish driver license, and the Formula STCC Northern European Zone (NEZ) championship at selected rounds. Points to these championships are awarded using the same system, with the sole exception of pole position and fastest lap not awarding points.

Formula STCC Drivers' Championship

Formula STCC Junior Svenskt Mästerskap

Formula STCC NEZ Championship

References

External links
 Official website of the category at STCC

Formula Renault
STCC Nordic
Motorsport competitions in Sweden